Gornostaev, also spelled as Gornostayev, is a common Russian male surname (female: Gornostaeva, Горностаева) and may refer to:

In particular, there were three Gornostaev architects, engaged in Russian Revival style and preservation of historical landmarks:

Alexey Maksimovich Gornostaev (1808–1862), Russian Revival pioneer, noted for Valaam Monastery tented churches, Trinity-Sergius Convent additions in Saint Petersburg and Uspenski Cathedral in Helsinki
Ivan Ivanovich Gornostaev (1821–1874), preservationist and chief architect of Saint Petersburg Public Library and University 
Fyodor Fyodorovich Gornostaev (1867–1915), also a preservationist, notable for Rogozhskoye Cemetery belltower (1908–1913), surveying and restoration of landmark buildings in Suzdal, Kursk and Moscow Kremlin.